Lower Lyde is a small village in Herefordshire, around  north of Hereford city centre. It forms part of the Pipe and Lyde civil parish.  The village can be easily accessed from the A49 road.

The main buildings are Lower Lyde Farm and Lower Lyde Court, a venue for weddings and performing arts events.

In the valley below the village are the River Lugg, the Welsh Marches railway line and the Wergins Stone, a prehistoric standing stone.

References

Villages in Herefordshire